Tkvarcheli (Tqwarchal; Ткуарчал (Tkuarchal) , Tkvarcheli) is a town in Abkhazia. It is situated on the river Ghalidzga (Aaldzga) and a railway connects it with Ochamchire. Akarmara, an area within the town, is a ghost town with abandoned apartments and factories which became uninhabited in the early 1990s due to the War in Abkhazia (1992-93), and is home to just 35 residents today.

History

Coal mining, which began in the area in 1935, grew in importance during the Second World War, especially after the Donbas was lost during the German invasion of the Soviet Union. Tkvarcheli was given town status on 9 April 1942.

During the War in Abkhazia (1992–93), Tkvarcheli withstood, through Russian military aid, a siege by the Georgian forces. Since 1995, it has been the centre of the newly formed Tkvarcheli District. On 27 September 2008, President Sergei Bagapsh awarded it the honorary title of Hero City.

Industry
Coal-mining has been the town's main industry, although now the Soviet mines are closed and coal is quarried only by the Abkhaz-Turkish Tamsaş company using the open pit method. Tamsaş's tax payments account for 75% of the Tkvarcheli district's budget however, the company was criticised for neglecting environmental requirements. Georgia regards all this investment as illegal, in clear violation of the 1996 CIS restrictions and has arrested several vessels, loaded with coal from Tkvarcheli, in its territorial waters, a measure that has reportedly brought Tamsaş to the verge of bankruptcy.

Demography
The town's population was 21,744 in 1989. The three main ethnic groups were Abkhaz (42.3%), Russians (24.5%) and Georgians (23.4%). As a result of the War in Abkhazia the town's industries all but stopped and its population decreased greatly and was between 7,000 and 8,000 in 2004 according to some sources and only 4,800 according to others. At the time of the 2003 census, its population was 4,786. By the time of the 2011 census, it had increased to 5,013. Of these, 66.5% were Abkhaz, 17.4% Georgian, 9.7% Russian, 1.3% Ukrainian, 1.1% Armenian and 0.4% Greek.

Gallery

Notes

References

Populated places in Tkvarcheli District
Sukhum Okrug